Johannes Cornelis (Jan) Vos  (born 9 February 1972 in Rotterdam) is a Dutch entrepreneur and politician. As a member of the Labour Party (Partij van de Arbeid) he was an MP between 20 September 2012 and 23 March 2017.

References 

1972 births
Living people
Labour Party (Netherlands) politicians
Members of the House of Representatives (Netherlands)
Politicians from Rotterdam
21st-century Dutch politicians